Ohi or OHI may refer to:

 Ohi Day, Greek celebration
 Ohi Racecourse, in Tokyo
 Ohi-Rail Corporation
 Ōi Nuclear Power Plant
 OHI, IATA Airport Code for Oshakati Airport